Fluorwavellite is a rare phosphate mineral with formula Al3(PO4)2(OH)2F•5H2O. As suggested by its name, it is a fluorine-analogue of wavellite (hence its name), a rather common phosphate mineral. Chemically similar aluminium fluoride phosphate minerals include fluellite, kingite and mitryaevaite.

Occurrence
Fluorwavellite was discovered in Silver Coin mine, Valmy, Humboldt County, Nevada, US.

References

Phosphate minerals
Aluminium minerals
Fluorine minerals
Orthorhombic minerals
Minerals in space group 53